In music, Op. 57 stands for Opus number 57. Compositions that are assigned this number include:

 Beethoven – Piano Sonata No. 23
 Chopin – Berceuse
 Dvořák – Violin Sonata
 Fauré – Shylock
 Glazunov – Raymonda
 Medtner – Violin Sonata No. 3
 Nielsen – Clarinet Concerto
 Prokofiev – Symphonic Song
 Reicha – L'art de varier
 Schumann – Belsatzar, ballad (Heine)
 Shostakovich – Piano Quintet